Live at the Sydney Opera House is a live album by Australian musician Paul Kelly. The album was released on 26 April 2019 and peaked at number 61 on the ARIA Charts.
The album captures Kelly show from the forecourt of Sydney Opera House which was broadcast live across the Australia on the ABC.

At the AIR Awards of 2020, the album was nominated for Best Independent Blues and Roots Album or EP.

Track listing

Charts

Release history

References

Paul Kelly (Australian musician) albums
2019 live albums
Albums recorded at the Sydney Opera House
Live albums by Australian artists